

1994–95 Major League Baseball strike
The following Major League Baseball players appeared as strikebreakers during spring training in 1995, crossing picket lines during the 1994–95 Major League Baseball strike. Some had not yet been placed on a 40-man roster, and as such were not eligible to join the MLBPA at the time of the strike, while others were former MLB players who had retired before the strike.  The list does not include replacement players who never appeared in regular-season MLB games.

Certain players who were part of World Series-winning teams were not permitted to have their names or likenesses on commemorative merchandise because they had been declared replacement players for having participated in the 1995 spring training. The players were Shane Spencer of the 1998, 1999 and 2000 New York Yankees, Damian Miller of the 2001 Arizona Diamondbacks, Brendan Donnelly of the 2002 Anaheim Angels, and Brian Daubach and Kevin Millar of the 2004 Boston Red Sox.

The names or likenesses of replacement players, since they are not permitted to join the MLBPA, are also in some cases not included in merchandise which derives its license from the MLBPA, such as video and tabletop games.  Many games nevertheless include them, with blank or fictional names and different appearances.

Replacement players

No MLB experience before strike

Joel Adamson
Benny Agbayani
Rudy Árias
Tony Barron
Steve Bourgeois
Doug Brady
Mike Busch
Edgar Caceres
Bubba Carpenter
Joel Chimelis
Alan Cockrell
Joe Crawford
Brian Daubach
Brendan Donnelly
Angel Echevarria
Charles Gipson
Brian Givens
Scarborough Green
Dave Hajek
Jason Hardtke
Pep Harris
Matt Herges
Matt Howard
Chris Latham
Cory Lidle
Kerry Ligtenberg
Rich Loiselle
Eric Ludwick
Bobby Magallanes
Ron Mahay
Tom Martin
Dan Masteller
Jamie McAndrew
Walt McKeel
Frank Menechino
Lou Merloni
Kevin Millar
Damian Miller
Eddie Oropesa
Keith Osik
Bronswell Patrick
Dale Polley
Alex Ramirez
Ron Rightnowar
Mandy Romero
Pete Rose Jr.
Chuck Smith
Shane Spencer
Joe Strong
Pedro Swann
Jeff Tam
Chris Truby
Jamie Walker

 Chimelis was briefly called up by the San Francisco Giants in June 1995, but never appeared in an MLB game, making him a phantom ballplayer.

Had MLB experience before strike

Shawn Abner
Jay Aldrich
Scott Anderson
Bob Ayrault
Mark Bailey
Bill Bates
Blaine Beatty
Kevin Belcher
Mike Bell
Terry Blocker
Pedro Borbón
Oil Can Boyd
Mike Christopher
Doug Corbett
Henry Cotto
Luis DeLeón
Gary Eave
Frank Eufemia
Steve Fireovid
Curt Ford
Jeff Grotewold
Guillermo Hernández
Kevin Hickey
Mark Huismann
Stan Jefferson
Steve Kiefer
Brent Knackert
Terry Lee
Bill Lindsey
Mitch Lyden
Lonnie Maclin
Rob Mallicoat
Greg Mathews
Craig McMurtry
José Mota
Ken Oberkfell
Junior Ortiz
Dave Pavlas
Pat Perry
Lenny Randle
Rick Reed
Nikco Riesgo
Dave Rohde
Wayne Rosenthal
Rich Sauveur
Jeff Schulz
Nelson Simmons
Doug Sisk
Joe Slusarski
Daryl Smith
Greg Smith
Ray Soff
Matt Stark
Bob Stoddard
Phil Stephenson
Glenn Sutko
Lou Thornton
Dave Von Ohlen
Dana Williams
Robbie Wine
Eric Yelding

1912 Detroit Tigers strike
On May 15, 1912, Detroit Tigers star Ty Cobb went into the stands and assaulted a fan who had been heckling him. Cobb was suspended by American League President Ban Johnson. The other Tigers refused to play unless Cobb was reinstated. Johnson threatened Tigers owner Frank Navin with a stiff fine if he did not field a team. So Manager Hughie Jennings quickly recruited a pickup team of sandlot players, semi-pro players, and college baseball students.

This replacement team played one game, on May 18, 1912, after which the Tigers players relented and returned to play future games (under threat of lifetime banishment).

The following players appeared in the May 18, 1912 game, which the Tigers lost to the Philadelphia Athletics, 24–2.

Ed Irwin
Hughie Jennings
Bill Leinhauser
Billy Maharg
Vincent Maney
Jim McGarr
Dan McGarvey
Deacon McGuire
Jack Smith
Joe Sugden
Allan Travers
Hap Ward

Joe Sugden and Deacon McGuire were Tigers coaches who had had long baseball careers. This game was their last major league appearance. Hughie Jennings was the Tigers manager; he also had had a long career and was later elected to the Baseball Hall of Fame. Jennings appeared as pinch hitter in the ninth inning.

None of the other players ever appeared in another major league game before or after, except for Billy Maharg, who appeared in one other game as a courtesy in the last game of the 1916 season. Maharg was later deeply involved in the Black Sox Scandal. Jack Smith played two innings in the field, but had no plate appearances and consequently no batting average. Ed Irwin was the only recruit to have a hit (the Tigers coaches each had one). Irwin had two triples, and so retired with a major league batting average of .667 and slugging average of 2.000. Allan Travers's 24 runs allowed is still the American League record for a complete game.

Arthur "Bugs" Baer, who later went on to become a noted journalist and humorist, was a member of the team, recruited as a backup bench player. He did not appear in the game.

References

Lists of Major League Baseball players
1994 Major League Baseball season
1995 Major League Baseball season